François Fiedler (1921–2001), born Fiedler Ferenc, was a Czechoslovakia-born French painter and printmaker. He was an artist in the Aimé Maeght stable, which included Marc Chagall, Alberto Giacometti and Joan Miró.

Biography
Fiedler was born in Košice, Czechoslovakia (now Slovakia), in 1921.

After receiving a Masters in Fine Arts degree from the Academy of Budapest, François Fiedler moved to Paris with his first wife in 1946. She died six months later, leaving him alone in a country where he barely spoke the language and had no friends. To make money, he made sanctioned reproductions of famous paintings for museums, as well as small figurative paintings of his own.

Fiedler met his second wife, Claire, with whom he lived in a small house in the forest south of Paris. One day while looking at a pot of house paint, crackled by the sun, he decided to reproduce this process on canvas. After this move, he ceased his figurative painting, finding expression in his new technique.

Joan Miró saw one of Fiedler's paintings in a  gallery and was impressed. He sought out the artist, and so met Fiedler; they became close friends, and Miró presented him to the prominent gallerist and art dealer Aimé Maeght. Through Maeght, he became close with Giacometti, Braque, César, Ubac, Tal-Coat, Miró, Chagall, and many other artists of this era.

During his long career, Fiedler was regularly featured in salon shows alongside his contemporaries, and his works were a regular feature in the Maeght Foundation publication Derrière le miroir.

As many young collectors did not have the money to buy an oil painting, Fiedler tried to find a way to convey in etchings that which he had achieved in oils. He started a series of etchings, some in very limited editions.

Aimé Maeght had told Fiedler that he was "next in line" to be made famous; in 1981 Maeght died before Fiedler could reach that level of fame. Following the death of Maeght, Fiedler found a patron in the art photographer Daniel Kramer, who supplied Fiedler with paint and canvases, while also serving as Fiedler's manager, photographer and publicist.

Fiedler died in Saint-Germain-Laval, Seine-et-Marne, France, in 2001, leaving behind a body of work including  oil paintings, monotype prints, and etchings. The Francois Fiedler Foundation was set up to promote and safeguard the work of Fiedler.

Fiedler's works can still be seen in museums and galleries, including the Maeght Foundation in Paris and the Guggenheim Museum in New York City.

References

External links 

 Francois Fiedler on artnet

Abstract painters
French contemporary painters
20th-century French painters
20th-century French male artists
French male painters
1921 births
2001 deaths
Czechoslovak emigrants to France
French abstract artists